Novin Keshavarz Tehran Volleyball Club also known as Bank Keshavarzi is an Iranian professional volleyball team based in Tehran, Iran.

Squads

2013 squad
 1.  Bahman Jahandideh
 3.  Mohammad Reza Hosseini-Pouya
 4.  Hamed Bagherpour
 5.  Zli Zolfaghari
 6.  Hamid Jafari
 7.  Mohammad Reza Moazzen
 8.  Mehdi Parastari
 9.  Mohammad Reza Heidari
 10.  Asghar Najafi
 11.  Khosro Farhadi
 12.  Saeid Shiroud
 13.  Hamid Hamoudi
 14.  Parviz Pezeshki
 15.  Amir Golriz
 16.  Mehdi Babaei
 17.  Masoud Eftekhari
 18.  Ramin Bigdeli
Heach coach:  Masoud Armat
Assistant coach:  Mehdi Aboutorabi
Team manager:  Mahmoud Khordbin

References

External links
 Rosters

Iranian volleyball clubs